is one of nine wards of Kobe, Japan. It has an area of 26.89 km², and a population of 219,958 (2008).

Tarumi is a suburban area in western Kobe, providing residential towns for commuters to downtown Kobe and even Osaka. The Akashi Kaikyō Bridge starts from this ward toward Awaji Island.

The area belonged to the Akashi Domain of Harima Province until the end of the Edo period. In 1899 the village of Tarumi was formed within Akashi District. In 1928 Tarumi village was renamed as a town. In July 1941, Tarumi merged into Kobe and became a part of Suma ward.

The modern Tarumi ward was formed from the area of the former Tarumi town in 1946. In 1947 a further seven villages from Akashi District merged into Kobe and became a part of Tarumi until 1982 when they were split off into the separate Nishi ward.

Education 

Kobe Korean Senior High School, a North Korea-aligned school, is in Tarumi-ku.

Prior to its 1990 move to Rokkō Island, Norwegian School was in Tarumi-ku.

Notes

External links

Official website of Tarumi-ku, Kobe 

Wards of Kobe